Orcuttia inaequalis is a rare species of grass known by the common name San Joaquin Valley Orcutt grass.

Distribution
It is endemic to the Central Valley of California, where it grows only in vernal pools, a rare and declining type of habitat. Many known occurrences of the plant have been extirpated as land in the heavily agricultural Central Valley has been altered, and it was federally listed as a threatened species in 1997.

Description
Orcuttia inaequalis is a small, hairy, gray-green annual bunchgrass forming tufts or mats up to about 15 centimeters tall. The fluffy, clustered inflorescence is a dense, headlike mass of spikelets, the characteristic that separates this Orcutt grass from the others, which have more spreading inflorescences.

References

External links
Jepson Manual Treatment - Orcuttia inaequalis
Grass Manual Treatment
Orcuttia inaequalis - Photo gallery

inaequalis
Endemic flora of California
Native grasses of California
Bunchgrasses of North America
Natural history of the Central Valley (California)